An arena is an enclosed area that showcases theatre, musical performances or sporting events.

Arena, ARENA, or the Arena may also refer to:

Places and jurisdictions 
 Arena, Saskatchewan, Canada
 Arena, Iran
 Arena, Calabria, Italy
 Arena, Mauritania, ancient city and former bishopric in Roman Africa, now Latin Catholic titular see
 La Arena District, Peru
 San Juan de la Arena, Spain
 Point Arena, California, United States
 Arena Township, Lac qui Parle County, Minnesota, United States
 Arena, North Dakota, United States
 Arena (town), Wisconsin, United States
 Arena, Wisconsin, village within the town

Stadiums and venues 
 2300 Arena, multipurpose sports venue in Philadelphia, Pennsylvania
 Arena, Vienna, cultural centre
 The Arena, purpose-built arena in Yas Island, Abu Dhabi
 The Arena (Ahmedabad) (EKA Arena), multi-purpose stadium in Ahmedabad, Gujarat, India
 The Arena, Ottawa, former indoor ice hockey arena in Canada
 The Arena, Miami, home stadium of the NBA's Miami Heat
 Erste Bank Arena, indoor sports stadium in Vienna
 Generali Arena (Vienna), former name of football stadium Franz Horr Stadium
 HWS Arena, sports and music venue in Poznań, Poland
 Johan Cruyff Arena, home stadium of football club AFC Ajax in Amsterdam, the Netherlands
 Pula Arena, amphitheatre in Croatia
 St. Louis Arena, former indoor arena in St. Louis, Missouri, United States
 Verona Arena, a Roman amphitheatre in Verona, Italy
 Vienna Watersports Arena, artificial whitewater venue

Arts and media

Film 
 Arena (1953 film), a 3-D Western starring Gig Young
 The Arena (1974 film), a gladiator B-movie starring Pam Grier
 Arena (1989 film), a science fiction film starring Paul Satterfield and Claudia Christian
 The Arena (2001 film), a direct-to-video remake of the 1974 film from producer Roger Corman
 Arena (2009 film), a Portuguese short film
 Arena (2011 film), an American film
 Arena (2013 film), a Russian film

Gaming 
 Arena Entertainment, a Mirrorsoft video game label
 ArenaNet, a computer game developer and part of NCsoft Corporation
 Quake III Arena, a multiplayer first-person shooter released on December 2, 1999
 The Elder Scrolls: Arena, the first game in The Elder Scrolls series, released in 1994
 Wing Commander Arena, a multiplayer Xbox 360 game
 Arena, a gameplay mode for Team Fortress 2
 OpenArena, a multiplayer, free, and open source first-person shooter
 Magic: The Gathering Arena, a video game adaptation of the Magic: The Gathering card game

Music 
 Arena (Duran Duran album), a 1984 live album by Duran Duran
 Arena (Asia album), a 1996 album by the band Asia
 Arena (Todd Rundgren album), a 2008 album by Todd Rundgren
 Arena (An Absurd Notion), a 1985 concert film by Duran Duran
 Arena (band), a British progressive rock band
 Arena rock, a form of rock music
 Arena di Verona Festival, an opera festival in Verona, Italy
 "The Arena", a 1966 song by Al Hirt

Printed works 
 "Arena" (short story), a 1944 science fiction story by Fredric Brown
 Countdown: Arena, a comic book series, published in 2007 by DC Comics
 Arena, a 2013 novel by Simon Scarrow and T.J. Andrews
 The Arena (novel), a 1962 suspense novel by William Haggard

Periodicals 
 Arena (magazine), a British style and entertainment magazine for men
 Arena (Swedish magazine), a Swedish magazine on culture and politics
 Arena Three, a British magazine for homosexual women published by the Minorities Research Group
 The Arena (magazine), a 1899–1909 American liberal literary and political magazine
 Arena (Australian publishing co-operative)
 L'Arena, Italian newspaper

Television 
 Arena (TV platform), a German pay TV network
 FOX Arena (TV network), an Australian cable channel
 "Arena" (Star Trek: The Original Series), a 1967 episode of Star Trek
 Arena (British TV series), a long-running BBC British documentary television series
 The Arena (TV series), a debate-style television show produced in Singapore
 Astro Arena (TV channel), Malaysian pay-TV channel
 Arena (miniseries), a 1976 Australian miniseries

People

Given name 
 Arena Williams (born 1990), New Zealand politician

Surname 
 Bruce Arena (born 1951), American soccer coach
 Felice Arena, Australian children's writer
 Gildo Arena (1921–2005), Italian water polo player and freestyle swimmer
 Lello Arena (born 1953), Italian actor
 Marie Arena (born 1966), Belgian politician
 Maurizio Arena (1933–1979), Italian actor
 Romina Arena (born 1980), Italian-American singer-songwriter
 Tina Arena (born 1967), Australian singer
 Walter Arena (born 1964), Italian race walker

Computing 
 Arena (software), simulation software
 Arena (web browser), a web browser developed by the W3C for testing support for HTML 3 and Cascading Style Sheets
 Arena allocation, a memory management technique that allows for efficient deallocation

Sports 
 Arena football, a variety of gridiron football
 Arena Football League, an American indoor football league
 Arena (swimwear), a French–Italian brand of competitive swimwear

Acronyms 
ARENA may refer to:
 Australian Renewable Energy Agency
 Nationalist Republican Alliance, a political party of El Salvador
 National Renewal Alliance Party, a former party of Brazil
 Former name of the Committee for Accuracy in Middle East Reporting in America

Other uses 
 Arena (countermeasure), a Russian active protection system for tanks
 Arena Pharmaceuticals, a biopharmaceutical company located in San Diego, California
 Arena station (UTA) in Salt Lake City
 Arena tram stop (Croydon) in the London Borough of Croydon
 Arena tram stop (Sheffield) on the Sheffield Supertram  network in Sheffield, UK

See also 
 Arenafilms, an Australian film production company
 Arenavirus, an RNA virus that mostly affects rodents
 Arenas (disambiguation)
 Larena (disambiguation)